Arsenio Benítez Garza (born 14 December 1971 in Luque, Central) is a retired football forward from Paraguay. He played professional football in Paraguay and Argentina during his career.

Benítez obtained his only cap for the Paraguay national football team as a substitute on 24 April 1996 in a World Cup qualifying match against Colombia.

External links

1971 births
Living people
Paraguayan footballers
Paraguay international footballers
Paraguayan expatriate footballers
Association football forwards
Footballers at the 1992 Summer Olympics
Olympic footballers of Paraguay
Expatriate footballers in Argentina
Sportspeople from Luque